Middleville is a village in Thornapple Township, Barry County, in the U.S. state of Michigan and part of the Grand Rapids metropolitan area. The population was 4,295 at the 2020 census.

History 
The first white settler to own land in the village was Calvin G. Hill, a native of New York, who bought  in 1834 on both sides of the Thornapple River. The village was likely surveyed and subdivided before 1850, but the plat was not officially recorded until 1859. Prior to 1843, the settlement was often called "Thornapple". The name Middleville was at first given to a post office on the stage coach line between Grand Rapids and Kalamazoo. The post office was located at the house of Benjamin S. Dibble in section 2 in northeast Yankee Springs Township. Dibble had agreed to accept the post office at the request of U.S. Representative Lucius Lyon, of Kent County. Lyon suggested the name "Dibbleville", but Dibble disliked that name. "Middleville" was suggested because of the proximity of an Indian village known as "Middle Village" on Scales Prairie near the boundary line between Thornapple and Yankee Springs townships. Dibble was appointed postmaster in July 1839 and continued until 1842. The next postmaster, John W. Bradley, continued to maintain the post office at Dibble's house until 1843, when it was moved to the present village of Middleville, with Calvin G. Hill as the postmaster. The village afterwards became known by the name of the post office.  The location of the original Indian village is NNE a few hundred yards of the present day intersection where Norris Rd. ends at Adams Rd.
http://www.dnr.state.mi.us/spatialdatalibrary/pdf_maps/glo_plats/barry/04n10w.pdf

Geography

Several West Michigan television stations have their transmitting towers in the Middleville area, including: WOOD-TV and WXMI.

Demographics

2010 census
As of the census of 2010, there were 3,319 people, 1,268 households, and 872 families residing in the village. The racial makeup of the village was 95.3% White, 0.2% African American, 0.7% Native American, 0.7% Asian, 1.1% from other races, and 2.0% from two or more races. Hispanic or Latino of any race were 4.4% of the population.

There were 1,268 households, of which 41.2% had children under the age of 18 living with them, 48.7% were married couples living together, 13.2% had a female householder with no husband present, 6.8% had a male householder with no wife present, and 31.2% were non-families. Of all households 27.1% were made up of individuals, and 13.8% had someone living alone who was 65 years of age or older. The average household size was 2.61 and the average family size was 3.16.

The median age in the village was 32.4 years. 30.5% of residents were under the age of 18; 7.3% were between the ages of 18 and 24; 28.2% were from 25 to 44; 21.8% were from 45 to 64; and 12.2% were 65 years of age or older. The gender makeup of the village was 48.5% male and 51.5% female.

2000 census
As of the census of 2000, there were 2,721 people, 998 households, and 711 families residing in the village. The racial makeup of the village was 95.74% White, 0.18% African American, 0.44% Native American, 0.74% Asian, 1.18% from other races, and 1.73% from two or more races. Hispanic or Latino of any race were 2.17% of the population.

There were 998 households, out of which 42.4% had children under the age of 18 living with them, 52.6% were married couples living together, 12.7% had a female householder with no husband present, and 28.7% were non-families. Of all households 24.5% were made up of individuals, and 10.0% had someone living alone who was 65 years of age or older.  The average household size was 2.72 and the average family size was 3.28.

In the village, the population was spread out, with 32.2% under the age of 18, 10.5% from 18 to 24, 32.3% from 25 to 44, 16.5% from 45 to 64, and 8.5% who were 65 years of age or older.  The median age was 30 years. For every 100 females, there were 95.6 males.  For every 100 females age 18 and over, there were 93.7 males.

The median income for a household in the village was $41,947, and the median income for a family was $46,357. Males had a median income of $34,750 versus $21,883 for females. The per capita income for the village was $17,005.  About 3.4% of families and 4.5% of the population were below the poverty line, including 4.3% of those under age 18 and 7.9% of those age 65 or over.

Education
There are five schools in Middleville, divided by grade level.  They are:

 McFall Elementary: young fives, kindergarten and 1st grade
 Lee Elementary: 2nd and 3rd grades
 Page Elementary: 4th and 5th grades
 Thornapple-Kellogg Middle School: 6th through 8th grades
 Thornapple-Kellogg High School: 9th through 12th grades

Recreation
A parking area for the trail is behind the Village Hall. Public restrooms are in the hall and the Village is further developing the Trail, adding a pavilion, repairing bridges, and paving more of the trail. A three-mile (5 km) section is already blacktopped, and is popular with roller-bladers, bikers, runners and walkers. The Middleville section runs along the Thornapple River and has three bridges. It has been called one of Michigan's most beautiful rail trails.

The village has a nine-hole disc golf course and a skate park in Village parks. Both are free.

Middleville is between the Middleville State Game Area and the Yankee Springs State Game, and Recreation, Areas. The Barry County SGAs are known for the number and size of the deer, so they are popular with deer hunters. The SGAs also offer turkey, grouse, squirrel, goose, duck, rabbit and raccoon hunting opportunities.

The Thornapple-Kellogg Middle School hosts the National 24-Hour Challenge bicycling event, held annually on Father's Day weekend.

Notable people
 Chad Curtis, former professional baseball player
 Allie Dragoo, Professional Cyclist - USA Cycling, Sho-Air Twenty20 (attended Middleville schools through Middle School before moving to East Grand Rapids)
 F. A. Harper, academic, economist, and writer.
 Brian Vander Ark, lead singer of The Verve Pipe

Citations

General references

External links
 Village of Middleville Homepage
 TK Schools Homepage
 National 24-Hour Challenge

1834 establishments in Michigan Territory
Grand Rapids metropolitan area
Populated places established in 1834
Villages in Barry County, Michigan
Villages in Michigan
×
×